Jason Goh Koon-Jong (born 18 December 1989) is a Singapore chess International Master. He won the national Singaporean Chess Championship in 2004. Represented Singapore three times in Chess Olympiads (2004, 2006, 2008). His current FIDE rating is 2415.

References

External links
 

1989 births
Living people
Singaporean sportspeople of Chinese descent
Singaporean chess players
Chess Olympiad competitors
Singapore Management University alumni
Southeast Asian Games bronze medalists for Singapore
Southeast Asian Games medalists in chess
Competitors at the 2005 Southeast Asian Games
21st-century Singaporean people